Barry Schmidt (born 15 February 1944) is a former Australian rules footballer who played for the Carlton Football Club in the Victorian Football League (VFL).

Notes

External links 

Barry Schmidt's profile at Blueseum

1944 births
Carlton Football Club players
Living people
Australian rules footballers from Victoria (Australia)